The Big Lagoon Union School District, headquartered in Big Lagoon, California, oversees public education, through grade 8, in a portion of coastal northern Humboldt County, California.  It operates one K-8 school in Big Lagoon.

References

External Links
 

School districts in Humboldt County, California